The Sigatoka Sand Dunes National Park is located at the mouth of the Sigatoka River on the island of Viti Levu in Fiji. They are located approximately 3 km west of the town of Sigatoka.

The dunes are the product of erosion in the coastal hinterland and coastal dune forming processes. The extensive dune system covers an area of 650 hectares and comprises a series of parabolic sand dunes. The dunes range from 2060 m tall. The dunes have been forming over thousands of years.

Archaeological excavations have uncovered pottery more than 2600 years old, as well as one of the largest burial sites in the Pacific. Evidence of the past is clearly visible throughout the dune system as pottery shards, stone tools, human remains and other archaeological relics continue to be uncovered by natural processes.

The sand dune ecosystem contributes to its national significance as outlined in Fiji's Biodiversity Strategy and Action Plan.

National Park status 

The dunes were designated Fiji's first National Park in July 1989 and consequently came under the management of the National Trust of Fiji. The dunes are now an important educational and recreational point for locals and tourists. Apart from being a key tourist destination, the dunes are an important source of archaeological artifacts and information for local and foreign universities and archaeological institutes.

World Heritage Status 
This site was added to the UNESCO World Heritage Tentative List on 26 October 1999 in the Cultural category.

References

External links
UNESCO World Heritage Centre – tentative list

Parks in Fiji
Landforms of Fiji
Dunes of Oceania
Preliminary Register of Sites of National Significance in Fiji
World Heritage Tentative List
Nadroga-Navosa Province